Bone Black is a novel, published in 2019, by Canadian author Carol Rose GoldenEagle.

In a long interview with Shelagh Rogers GoldenEagle described her experience in the decades as a journalist of First Nations women being covered only as victims.  They discussed the long history of prejudice against First Nations women.  They discussed the long history of police inaction in the investigation of missing First Nations women.

Plot
When her twin sister Raven visits her she and her hero Wren Strongeagle visit a bar, for a scheduled event, only to disappear when she goes to the washroom.  Her reports of her disappearance are discounted by the police, who tell her that Raven probably met someone and left for a sexual encounter.  Frustrated by police inaction, Strongeagle tracking down and kills serial killers who are preying on First Nations women.

Reviews
The Regina Leader-Post wrote: "Wren is a deep character, and GoldenEagle’s prose is vivid with a hint of poetry."

References

2019 Canadian novels
First Nations culture
Missing and Murdered Indigenous Women and Girls movement